Testimony is the statement of a witness in court.

Testimony may also refer to:

Film and television
 Testimony (1920 film), a British silent film by Guy Newall
 The Testimony (1946 film), an Italian crime film
 Testimony (1988 film), Tony Palmer's film about Shostakovich
 The Testimony (2015 film), an American short-documentary film
 Testimony, a 2000–2004 program broadcast by BET
 "Testimony" (Veep), a television episode
 "The Testimony" (Dynasty), a television episode

Literature 
 Testimony (Volkov book), the book about Dmitri Shostakovich by Solomon Volkov
 Testimony (Shreve novel), a 2008 novel by Anita Shreve
 Testimony (Turow novel), a 2017 novel by Scott Turow

Music

Albums
 Testimony (August Alsina album), 2014
 Testimony (Dana Glover album) or the title song, 2002
 Testimony (Gloria Gaynor album), 2019
 Testimony (Neal Morse album), 2003
 Testimony (Stella Parton album), 2008
 Testimony (The Gap Band album) or the title song, 1994
 Testimony (Virtue album) or the title song, 2006
 Testimony: Vol. 1, Life & Relationship, by India.Arie, 2006

Songs
 "Testimony", by DC Talk from Free at Last, 1992
 "Testimony", by Kodak Black from Dying to Live, 2018
 "Testimony", by Robbie Robertson from Robbie Robertson, 1987

Other uses
 Testimony Films, a TV production company
 The Testimony (magazine), a Bible magazine

See also
 Testify (disambiguation)